Cihat Arslan (born 9 February 1970) is a Turkish football manager and former player.

Managerial career
In December 2015, Arslan was named manager of Süper Lig side Akhisarspor in the 2015–16 season. He was sacked on 1 September 2016, but was once again Akhisarspor manager from 2018 to 2019.

In February 2019, he became the new manager of Bosnian Premier League club Čelik Zenica. After the end of the 2018–19 Bosnian Premier League, Arslan decided to leave Čelik.

In February 2020, he became the new manager of TFF Second League club Manisa.

Honours

Player
Galatasaray
Süper Lig: 1993–94
Süper Kupa: 1993

Yozgatspor
TFF First League: 1999–00

Kasımpaşa
2. Liga: 2005–06

Manager
İstanbul B.B. 
TFF First League: 2013–14

References

External links
Profile at TFF 

1970 births
Living people
Sportspeople from Balıkesir
Turkish footballers
Süper Lig players
Karşıyaka S.K. footballers
Galatasaray S.K. footballers
Eskişehirspor footballers
Zeytinburnuspor footballers
Kocaelispor footballers
İstanbul Başakşehir F.K. players
Association football defenders
Turkish football managers
Süper Lig managers
Premier League of Bosnia and Herzegovina managers
Akhisarspor managers
NK Čelik Zenica managers
Yeni Malatyaspor managers